The play-offs of the 2021 Billie Jean King Cup Americas Zone Group II were the final stages of the Group II zonal competition involving teams from the Americas. Using the positions determined in their pools, the fifteen teams faced off to determine their placing in the 2021 Billie Jean King Cup Americas Zone Group II. The top two teams advanced to Billie Jean King Cup Americas Zone Group I.

Promotional play-offs 
The first placed teams of each pool were drawn in head-to-head round. The winners advanced to Group I in 2022.

Ecuador vs. Uruguay

Guatemala vs. Bolivia

3rd to 4th play-offs 
The second placed teams of each pool were drawn in head-to-head rounds to find the 3rd placed teams.

Bahamas vs. El Salvador

Dominican Republic vs. Honduras

5th to 6th play-offs 
The third placed teams of each pool were drawn in head-to-head rounds to find the 5th placed teams.

Costa Rica vs. Cuba

Jamaica vs. Puerto Rico

Final placements 

References

External links 
 Billie Jean King Cup website

2020–21 Billie Jean King Cup Americas Zone